Odorrana exiliversabilis (Fujian bamboo-leaf frog) is a species of frogs in the family Ranidae that is endemic to southeastern China where it is found in Fujian, western Zhejiang, and southern Anhui provinces. These frogs can be found in mountain forest streams and are common in suitable habitat. The species is not considered threatened by the IUCN.

Molecular genetic analysis of mitochondrial DNA puts Odorrana exiliversabilis in the same clade with Odorrana tormota, Odorrana nasica, Odorrana nasuta, and Odorrana versabilis.

Description
Males measure  and females  in snout–vent length.

References

exiliversabilis
Frogs of China
Endemic fauna of China
Amphibians described in 2001
Taxonomy articles created by Polbot